Marktoffingen is a municipality in the district of Donau-Ries in Bavaria in Germany.

Gallery

References

Donau-Ries